Witoto, or Huitoto, is an indigenous American language or language family spoken in Colombia and Peru.

Notes

References

Witoto
Bora–Witoto languages
Languages of Colombia
Languages of Peru